Wang Xiaoyan (born 31 July 1969) is a Chinese speed skater. She competed in the women's 5000 metres at the 1988 Winter Olympics.

References

1969 births
Living people
Chinese female speed skaters
Olympic speed skaters of China
Speed skaters at the 1988 Winter Olympics
Place of birth missing (living people)
Speed skaters at the 1986 Asian Winter Games
Speed skaters at the 1990 Asian Winter Games